Semyon Mikhaylovich Lazarchik (born 3 September 2000) is a Belarusian professional footballer who plays for Dubnica.

References

External links 
 
 

2000 births
Living people
Belarusian footballers
Association football defenders
Belarusian expatriate footballers
Expatriate footballers in the Czech Republic
Expatriate footballers in Slovakia
FC Isloch Minsk Raion players
FC BATE Borisov players
FC Silon Táborsko players
FK Dubnica players